Georg Liebsch (5 April 1911 – 10 November 1998) was a German featherweight weightlifter who won the world title in 1937 and 1938 and placed fifth at the 1936 Summer Olympics. He set two ratified world records in the press, in 1935 and 1937.

References

1911 births
1998 deaths
Sportspeople from Düsseldorf
German male weightlifters
Olympic weightlifters of Germany
Weightlifters at the 1936 Summer Olympics
World record setters in weightlifting
World Weightlifting Championships medalists
20th-century German people